Eldenia Medagedara Dilshan yasika Munaweera, commonly known as Dilshan Munaweera (born 24 April 1989 in Colombo), is a professional Sri Lankan cricketer, who plays limited over formats for the national side. He is a member of 2012 ICC World Twenty20 for Sri Lanka. He is a right-handed batsman, who can hit very hard and a handy off break bowler.

Early and domestic career
Coming from a cricketing background Munaweera is the son of former first class cricketer Sudath Munaweera and Manjula Munaweera also played women's cricket. Munaweera got married in 2016 to Sanjeewani Palihakkara who is a fashion designer.

He was educated at Nalanda College Colombo and played cricket for the college first XI team from 2006 to 2008.

In April 2018, he was named in Colombo's squad for the 2018 Super Provincial One Day Tournament. In November 2021, he was selected to play for the Colombo Stars following the players' draft for the 2021 Lanka Premier League.

International career
Munaweera has played first-class cricket for Bloomfield Cricket and Athletic Club. He has also played four Twenty20 Internationals for Sri Lanka.

He represented Sri Lanka at the 2008 ICC Under-19 Cricket World Cup and at the 2010 Asian Games.

Munaweera was picked up for the 3-T20Is against Australia in 2017 as a senior batsman, where many senior players were ruled out due to injuries. In his comeback match on 17 February 2017, Munaweera scored 29-ball 44 runs to provide a fast start to the chase. Sri Lanka finally won the match by 5 wickets. In August 2017, he was added to Sri Lanka's One Day International (ODI) squad ahead of the fourth match against India. He made his ODI debut on 31 August 2017 against India. He only scored 11 runs and Sri Lanka lost the match by 168 runs.

In May 2018, he was one of 33 cricketers to be awarded a national contract by Sri Lanka Cricket ahead of the 2018–19 season.

References

External links

1989 births
Living people
Sri Lankan cricketers
Sri Lanka One Day International cricketers
Sri Lanka Twenty20 International cricketers
Bloomfield Cricket and Athletic Club cricketers
Rajshahi Royals cricketers
Alumni of Nalanda College, Colombo
Cricketers at the 2010 Asian Games
Basnahira North cricketers
Sebastianites Cricket and Athletic Club cricketers
Wayamba cricketers
Uva Next cricketers
Basnahira cricketers
Galle Guardians cricketers
Barbados Royals cricketers
Sheikh Jamal Dhanmondi Club cricketers
Prime Bank Cricket Club cricketers
Sylhet Strikers cricketers
Balkh Legends cricketers
Asian Games competitors for Sri Lanka
Dambulla Aura cricketers
South Asian Games silver medalists for Sri Lanka
South Asian Games medalists in cricket